Hartweg's climbing salamander (Bolitoglossa hartwegi), also known as Hartweg's mushroomtongue salamander, and Hartweg's salamander, is a species of salamander in the family Plethodontidae. It is found in the north-central Chiapas, Mexico, and the adjacent Guatemalan Sierra de los Cuchumatanes.

Etymology
This species is named after Norman Hartweg, American herpetologist and "an able scientist who spent many years studying
Chiapan amphibians and reptiles and who stimulated and guided many investigations of the biology of tropical organisms."

Description
Males measure  and females  in snout–vent length (SVL). The tail is robust and about two thirds of SVL. The body is robust and the snout is relatively short and truncate. The limbs are slender and moderately long. The hands and feet are relatively large.

Habitat and conservation
It lives in crevices, sometimes found under flakes of rock or under the bark of logs, but even arboreal bromeliads. It is a common species that tolerates habitat modification reasonably well, although habitat loss can still be a threat.

References

hartwegi
Amphibians of Guatemala
Amphibians of Mexico
Amphibians described in 1969
Taxa named by David B. Wake
Taxonomy articles created by Polbot